The National Democrats Party (NDP) was a small right-wing political party in New Zealand, formed in 1999 by Anton Foljambe.

The party described itself as "New Zealand's only conservative political party". It was generally regarded as crypto-fascist, but not racist. Foljambe ran as an election candidate two or three times, with poor results. Kyle Chapman became Deputy Chairman of the NDP, and ran unsuccessfully for Mayor of Christchurch in 2007, pulling approximately 1% of the vote.

The party's policies included strident anti-communism and anti-feminism, the restoration of capital punishment and corporal punishment and strong national defence. It advocated a "corporatist" constitution, and had a conspiratorial view of world events.

Foljambe resigned from the party in 2007. The party now appears to be defunct. Its website is no longer operational.

References

Nationalist parties in Oceania
Political parties established in 1999
Defunct political parties in New Zealand
Far-right politics in New Zealand
1999 establishments in New Zealand
Anti-communism
Criticism of feminism
Conservative parties in New Zealand
New Zealand nationalism